Mother ship is a vessel or aircraft which carries smaller vessels or aircraft which operate independently of it.

Mother ship or Mothership may also refer to:

 Mother Ship, a 1980 album by Larry Young
 Mothership (Led Zeppelin album), 2007
 Mothership (Dance Gavin Dance album), 2016
 "Mothership" (song), a 2006 single by Enter Shikari
 Mother Ship, an album by Lego Big Morl
 Mothership (composition), a 2011 composition by Mason Bates
 Mo Thugs III: The Mothership, a 2000 album by Mo Thugs Family
"Mothership", a song by Aurora from A Different Kind of Human (Step 2)
 Law & Order, a TV series often referred to as "The Mother Ship" by producers and critics
 Mothership (website), a Singaporean community news service
 The Mothership, an upcoming science fiction film

See also
 Mothership Connection, a 1975 album by the George Clinton band Parliament